Haldipada railway station is a railway station on Kharagpur–Puri line, part of the Howrah–Chennai main line under Kharagpur railway division of South Eastern Railway zone. It is situated beside National Highway 60 at Guhipur, Haldipada in Balasore district in the Indian state of Odisha. A total of 20 passengers trains stop at Haldipada railway station.

History
In between 1893 and 1896 the East Coast State Railway constructed Howrah–Chennai main line. Kharagpur–Puri branch was finally opened for public in 1901. The route was electrified in several phases. In 2005, Howrah–Chennai route was completely electrified.

Accident
On 29 December 1957, at about 22.14 hours, whilst Train No. 10 DN Janata Express was on the run between Rupsa and Haldipada stations, the driver heard an unusual sound and brought the train to a   stand. On examination, it was found that the right hand rear bogie wheel tyre of the engine had burst. As the engin-e was not able to move, the rake of the Janata Express was drawn to Rupsa station. After the rake had been pulled back, efforts were made to pull the disabled engine, but it derailed of two front wheels.

References

Railway stations in Balasore district
Kharagpur railway division